Emelie Öhrstig, born 27 February 1978 in Borås, Sweden, is a Swedish cross-country skier and road racing cyclist. As a cross-country skier she who won a gold medal during the 2005 Nordic World Ski Championships in Oberstdorf, Germany.  She also has eleven additional victories up to 15 km from 2002 to 2005, and her best individual finish in Turin at the 2006 Winter Olympics was 22nd in the individual sprint.

In April 2006 she resigned as a member of the Piteå Elit team and has since been listed on the website for the International Ski Federation as retired.

Along with Per Elofsson, she was an expert commentator for Viasat during 2014 Winter Olympics. Prior to that, she had been an expert commentator at Sveriges Television from 2009, until joining Viasat in 2014. Since August 2014, Öhrstig has been an employee at Volvo Cars. As of 2017, she is currently a director of customer experience and retail for the Swedish market.

Cross-country skiing results
All results are sourced from the International Ski Federation (FIS).

Olympic Games

World Championships
 1 medal – (1 gold)

World Cup

Season standings

Team podiums

 1 podium – (1 )

References

External links

Swedish female cross-country skiers
Cross-country skiers at the 2006 Winter Olympics
Olympic cross-country skiers of Sweden
Cross-country skiers from Västra Götaland County
People from Borås
1978 births
Living people
FIS Nordic World Ski Championships medalists in cross-country skiing
Swedish female cyclists
Piteå Elit skiers
20th-century Swedish women
21st-century Swedish women